The Bancroft family are the former owners of Dow Jones & Company which is now owned by Rupert Murdoch's News Corporation (NewsCorp).

The Family 

The Bancrofts are a family of publicly reclusive Boston socialites who inherited The Wall Street Journal from Clarence W. Barron, who as a publisher built up the reputation of that newspaper. Upon Barron's death in 1928, control of the company passed to his stepdaughters Jane and Martha, children of his wife, Jessie Waldron.  Barron's son-in-law and Jane's husband, Harvard-educated lawyer Hugh Bancroft (1879-1933), ran the company and the paper for the next five years. Suffering from depression, Bancroft committed suicide in 1933 at the age of 54. The family members maintained ownership of the company through ensuing generations, though management was placed in the hands of professionals, like Journal editor Bernard Kilgore.

A notable family member of the following generation was Mary Bancroft (1903-1997), Hugh Bancroft's only daughter by his first marriage to Mary Agnes Cogan (1879-1903). She worked for U.S. intelligence in Switzerland during World War II. She wrote novels and a memoir, Autobiography of a Spy, before dying in 1997 at age ninety-three. She was survived by six grandchildren and twelve great-grandchildren.

Jane Bancroft's daughter Jessie Bancroft Cox was another prominent member of the second generation. Her husband, son, and grandson — William C. Cox, Bill Cox Jr., and Billy Cox III, respectively — were "the only Bancrofts to have actually worked at Dow Jones since Hugh Bancroft's suicide."

The family members' private pastimes consist mainly of show-horse breeding, sailing, and farming.  However, the family has also produced a speedboat champion and an airline pilot.

Dow Jones-NewsCorp sale 

At the time of the 2007 sale of the Dow Jones Co. to NewsCorp, the Bancroft family (more than thirty members) owned 42 percent of the business but controlled 68 percent of the voting stock, through their possession of 7.5 million Class B shares. In the sale to Murdoch, the Bancrofts made more than $1.2 billion.

Bancroft family representatives filled three seats on the Dow Jones board of directors, representing three branches of the family — the descendants of the three children of Hugh and Jane Bancroft. At the time of the sale, those board members included Christopher Bancroft and his cousins Leslie Hill and Elizabeth Steele.

The Bancroft family initially held out for three months against Murdoch's advances until accepting a $60-per-share offer from NewsCorp.

References 

The Wall Street Journal people
Dow Jones & Company
Business families of the United States